WDCZ is an American radio station in Buffalo, New York broadcasting at 970 kHz.

WDCZ has not originated any programming of its own since 2012. The station operated as a commercial station from its launch in 1924 until 1975, then operated as a public radio station from 1975 to 2012. In its later years, much of its programming was duplicating that of competing FM station WBFO, which eventually prompted the two stations to merge operations (using WBFO's frequency) in 2012. After several months of simulcasting WBFO, the 970 facility was sold off to the owners of religious-formatted WDCX-FM, who in turn switched 970 to a simulcast of WDCX, a status it has held ever since.

History
WDCZ was launched on October 14, 1924 as WEBR. Fran Striker, later famous for co-creating the Lone Ranger, worked for the station in the early 1930s. From 1936 to 1944, WEBR was an affiliate of the Blue Network (later the American Broadcasting Company) and then with the Mutual Broadcasting System. The station was a commercial operation for its first five decades on air, competing (generally with a measure of success, despite the weakness of its highly directional signal that is aimed directly at Toronto) against competing Buffalo stations. At at least two points in its history it was a sister station to WBEN, during the times when regulatory rules allowed it.

The station changed formats and owners (one of which was the Buffalo Courier-Express) in the early 1970s until the Western New York Public Broadcasting Association, who had owned WNED-TV since 1959, bought WEBR and sister station WREZ-FM (now WNED-FM) in 1975. WEBR adopted an (almost) all-news format a year later (although an evening and overnight jazz program, Jazz In The Nighttime with Al Wallack, remained on the air). In 1993 the station was assigned the WNED calls and all non-news programming was dropped. (The WEBR call sign, history and Wallack's jazz program would later be acquired by local taxicab company owner Bill Yuhnke and assigned to the former WJJL on AM 1440 in 2020; in addition to Wallack, former WEBR midday jock Jack Horohoe was brought out of retirement to resume his show.)

Unlike its counterpart WBFO, which still had music programming in midday, at night and on the weekend, WNED focused entirely on spoken-word programming. Several of the programs on WNED and WBFO (specifically both drive time programs, Morning Edition and All Things Considered) overlapped with different production teams for local inserts, each with its own hosts. (In addition, the weekend A Prairie Home Companion aired on both WNED-AM and WNED-FM, an arrangement that continues as of 2013 with WBFO and WNED-FM.)

Until March 1, 2012, WNED was one of two National Public Radio affiliates in Buffalo. The remaining affiliate is WBFO, formerly operated by the University of Buffalo.  WBFO was purchased from the State of New York by the Western New York Public Broadcasting Association, the parent organization of WNED, WNED-TV and WNED-FM in July 2011.
With WNED's takeover of WBFO, the duplication of programming was expected to end; there had been speculation (which turned out to be accurate) that WNED would be sold despite strong support in the local market for differentiated jazz, blues, news and talk programming. WNED was also chosen as the station to be divested because, as it was later revealed in 2020, its directional signal had a strong signal over the city of Toronto, but the stations had minimal listenership there; this is in contrast to their television station WNED-TV, which has a strong audience in the city.

On March 1, 2012, WNED ceased independent operations and began simulcasting WBFO.  This led to much of the news and information programming that had aired on the weekend by WNED being replaced by NPR entertainment programs, such as Wait Wait Don't Tell Me and Car Talk (some of the displaced programs later returned after Talk of the Nation was canceled).  WNED, which had not aired music since 1993, now aired blues programming Saturday and Sunday evenings, but in return, WBFO (and, with it, the entire Buffalo market) was stripped of all of its jazz programming.

On August 29, 2012, Crawford Broadcasting, a Denver based firm, announced its intention to buy the then-WNED for $875,000. A spokeswoman for WNED said a closing date for the sale depended on approval by regulators. Donald B. Crawford, the Crawford Broadcasting president said that he expected his company to take over the station and begin programming it around January 1, 2013.  The WBFO simulcast continued until midnight November 30, 2012. The owner at that time had announced at 10 pm that it would cease operations at midnight. The station was silent for an entire month which gave those who enjoy trying to receive distant stations an opportunity to receive distant signals at or near that frequency that they would not otherwise have. The station returned to the air as WDCZ on January 1, 2013 as a simulcast of WDCX-FM (99.5). This is a second station for Crawford in the Buffalo market as it is the long time owner of WDCX, whose programming it planned to simulcast in order to further its reach into southern Ontario (this despite WDCX already having one of the strongest signals in the entire country and one that easily covers Southern Ontario), further perpetuating the same type of duplicity that had prompted the previous owners to sell the station in the first place. The finalization of the sale took place at midnight November 30, 2012, through licensee Kimtron, Inc; the station's call sign was changed the same day to WDCZ.

See also
WNED-TV
WNED-FM
WBFO
WDCX-FM

References

References from The Buffalo News are limited without paid access.

External links

WNED Dialogues Blog; this has links to the station's past which may be of interest
FCC History Cards for WDCZ

DCZ
Radio stations established in 1924
DCZ